SWIFT J1756.9−2508 is a millisecond pulsar with a rotation frequency of 182 Hz (period of 5.5 ms). It was discovered in 2007 by the Swift Gamma-Ray Burst Explorer and found to have a companion with a mass between 0.0067 and 0.030 solar masses. It is thought that the companion is the remnant of a former companion star, now stripped down to a planetary-mass core. The pulsar is accreting mass from this companion, resulting in occasional violent outbursts from the accumulated material on the neutron star.

SWIFT J1756.9-2508's only known planet is notable for its orbital period of less than an hour.

External links
 Universe Today, Pulsar Has Almost Completely Devoured a Star
 SIMBAD, "SWIFT J1756.9-2508" (accessed 2010-11-06)

References

Accreting millisecond pulsars
X-ray binaries
Sagittarius (constellation)
?
Hypothetical planetary systems